Abdi Muya Salim (born 1 April 2001) is a Kenyan professional footballer who plays as a defender for Orlando City of Major League Soccer.

Early years
Born in Nairobi, Kenya, Salim grew up in Dagahaley refugee camp in Dadaab. Having applied for asylum in the United States before Salim was born, his parents were granted a visa in 2003 and relocated once Salim had recovered from malaria. They settled in Buffalo, New York. Salim attended Hutchinson Central Technical High School and played his first-ever organized soccer game with youth club Delaware SC in 2013. In 2018, he was recruited for Rochester-based Empire United where he captained the US Developmental Academy under-17 and under-19 teams during a two-year spell.

College career
In 2019, Salim began playing college soccer for the Buffalo State Bengals, a Division III State University of New York Athletic Conference (SUNYAC) program at Buffalo State University where older brother Saleman had already played the 2018 season. He played one season, starting 18 games, scoring one goal and leading the Bengals in minutes played. He was named SUNYAC Rookie of the Year and SUNYAC Defensive Player of the Year.

Ahead of the 2020 season, Salim entered the transfer portal and joined Division I program Syracuse Orange of the Atlantic Coast Conference. With the season disrupted by the COVID-19 pandemic, he started the first eight games of the season before suffering an ACL tear against Bowling Green Falcons on 23 February 2021 and underwent surgery, ruling him out for the remainder of the 2020–21 spring season and the subsequent 2021 fall campaign. He returned for the 2022 season, playing in 22 of a possible 25 games including every minute of all three ACC Tournament games and all five in the NCAA Tournament. Syracuse did the clean sweep of 2022 ACC regular season, 2022 ACC tournament and 2022 NCAA Division I tournament titles, the first national championship win in program history.

Club career

Ocean City Nor'easters
In May 2022, during the college offseason, Salim joined USL League Two side Ocean City Nor'easters. He made seven appearances as Ocean City went undefeated and topped the Mid Atlantic Division.

Orlando City
On 21 December 2022, Salim was selected in the first round (17th overall) of the 2023 MLS SuperDraft by Orlando City. After training with the club in preseason, he was signed to a one-year contract with three additional club option years on 14 February 2023.

Career statistics

College

Club

Honors 
Syracuse Orange
Atlantic Coast Conference regular season: 2022
Atlantic Coast Conference tournament: 2022
NCAA College Cup: 2022

Individual
SUNYAC Rookie of the Year: 2019
SUNYAC Defensive Player of the Year: 2019

References

External links 
Abdi Salim at Syracuse Orange

2001 births
Living people
Footballers from Nairobi
Soccer players from New York (state)
Kenyan footballers
Kenyan expatriate footballers
Kenyan expatriate sportspeople in the United States
Association football defenders
Buffalo State Bengals men's soccer players
Expatriate soccer players in the United States
Ocean City Nor'easters players
Orlando City SC draft picks
Orlando City SC players
Refugees in the United States
Syracuse Orange men's soccer players
USL League Two players